The 1891 Egmont by-election was a by-election held on 17 February 1891 during the 11th New Zealand Parliament in the Taranaki electorate of .

The by-election was caused by the resignation of the incumbent MP Harry Atkinson when he was appointed to the Legislative Council, along with six other Conservatives; to block any radical measures introduced by the new Liberal Government of John Ballance.

The by-election was won by Felix McGuire.

McGuire was opposed by Robert Bruce who had previously represented .

Results

Notes

Egmont 1891
1891 elections in New Zealand
Politics of Taranaki